The 1890 Grand National was the 52nd renewal of the Grand National horse race that took place at Aintree near Liverpool, England, on 28 March 1890.

Finishing Order

Non-finishers

References

 1890
Grand National
Grand National
19th century in Lancashire